Traudl Ebert (born 8 March 1936) is an Austrian fencer. She competed in the women's individual and team foil events at the 1960 Summer Olympics.

References

External links
 

1936 births
Living people
Sportspeople from Klagenfurt
Austrian female foil fencers
Olympic fencers of Austria
Fencers at the 1960 Summer Olympics